The District Council of Ceduna is a local government area located on the far west coast of the Eyre Peninsula in South Australia. The district has a diverse business and industry with an estimated 240,000 tourists passing through every year.
The township of Ceduna is the focal point of the district.

Industry and history
The land in the district has long been used for agricultural purposes, in fact, between the 1850s and 1880s, much of the land was one large sheep station.

Port Thevenard has been an exporter of gypsum, salt, Grain and mineral sand, with up to 1.2 million tonnes of gypsum being exported per year.

Smoky Bay and Denial Bay have been growing oysters using aquaculture for over ten years now, with Denial and Smoky Bay now the second and third largest producing areas in the state respectively.

Tourism is also a large part of the districts economy, with Smoky Bay and Ceduna attracting the largest crowds. The area's attractions are largely to do with the marine environment, with fishing and whale watching popular.

The council was first established in 1925 as the District Council of Murat Bay. It was renamed the District Council of Ceduna in 1994.

Localities
The town of Ceduna is the major town of the district; it also includes the localities of Ceduna Waters, Charra, Chinbingina, Denial Bay, Kalanbi, Koonibba, Laura Bay, Maltee, Merghiny, Mudamuckla, Nadia, Nunjikompita, Puntabie, Smoky Bay, Thevenard, Uworra, Wandana, Watraba, White Well Corner, and part of Carawa, Pimbaacla, Pureba and Yumbarra.

Facilities
Ceduna contains all essential facilities including shopping centres, fuel stations, a hospital, an area school and a variety of accommodation. The smaller towns contain much less, with most having only a roadhouse and possibly a caravan park.

Recreational facilities include
 Library
 Boat Ramps & Marina
 Jetties

Council

The District Council of Ceduna has a directly-elected mayor.

Chairmen and Mayors of Murat Bay/Ceduna

 C. A. Tonkin (1925) 
 George Owen Lovelock (1932-1941) 
 Denis Edward Maloney (1941-1943) 
 Edward Morley Borlase (1944-1946) 
 Peter Sides Morrison (1946-1959) 
 Clive Keitel (1959-1970) 
 Jeffrey Charles Bergmann (1970-1981) 
 Desmond Robert Whitmarsh (1981-1983) 
 Jeffrey Charles Bergmann (1983-?) 
 Malcolm Puckridge (1987-1998) 
 Allan Suter (2006–present)

See also
List of parks and gardens in rural South Australia

References

External links
LGA: District Council of Ceduna
Council website

Eyre Peninsula
Local government areas of South Australia